Flying Under the Radar is the second compilation album by the American country rock/southern rock band The Kentucky Headhunters. It was released in 2006 via the CBuJ Ent. label. The album includes seven tracks from their 2000 album Songs from the Grass String Ranch, and two each from 2003's Soul and 2005's Big Boss Man. Also included are four new tracks: the newly written "Go to Heaven" and "Ashes of Love", as well as a cover of Stoney Cooper and Wilma Lee Cooper's "Big Midnight Special" and a re-recording of the Roger Miller song "Chug-a-Lug", which the band previously covered on Big Boss Man.

Track listing

Personnel
The Kentucky Headhunters
Anthony Kenney – bass guitar, harmonica, background vocals
Greg Martin – electric guitar, acoustic guitar, 12-string guitar, background vocals
Doug Phelps – acoustic guitar, 12-string guitar, electric guitar, lead vocals
Fred Young – drums, percussion, background vocals
Richard Young – acoustic guitar, electric guitar, lead and background vocals
Guest musicians
Robbie Bartlett – second lead vocals on "Everyday People"
Chris Dunn – trombone
Jim Horn – alto saxophone, tenor saxophone, baritone saxophone, horn arrangements
Steve Patrick – trumpet
Reese Wynans – piano, Hammond B-3 organ

2006 compilation albums
The Kentucky Headhunters albums